
Year 732 (DCCXXXII) was a leap year starting on Tuesday (link will display the full calendar) of the Julian calendar. The denomination 732 for this year has been used since the early medieval period, when the Anno Domini calendar era became the prevalent method in Europe for naming years.

Events 
 By place 
 Byzantine Empire 
 Byzantine Emperor Leo III marries his 15 year old son Constantine to Tzitzak (later baptised as Irene), the daughter of the Khazar Khagan Bihar, as a sign of diplomatic unity between the Byzantine Empire and the Khazar Khaganate.
 Europe 
 Battle of the River Garonne: A Umayyad Muslim army (40,000 men) under Abdul Rahman Al Ghafiqi, governor of Al-Andalus, crosses the Pyrenees through the Roncesvalles Pass and raids widely, ravaging the cities of Oloron, Lescar and Bayonne, and burning the abbey of Saint-Sever. Umayyad forces destroy the monastery of Saint-Émilion, and defeat the 'Count of Libourne'. Abdul Rahman sacks and captures Bordeaux, and nearly wipes out the army of Duke Eudes of Aquitaine, at the Garonne River. 
 Summer – Eudes of Aquitaine heads for the Frankish city of Reims, to warn Charles Martel, Merovingian mayor of the palace, of the Umayyad invasion in Gaul, and ask for his support against the invaders. The two leaders meet near Paris; Charles issues a 'general ban' to raise an army, which includes large numbers of Austrasians, Neustrians, and Burgundians. Meanwhile, Arabians ravage the cities of Périgueux, Saintes and Angoulême, then sack the basilica of Saint-Hilaire outside Poitiers.
 September – Charles Martel leads his Frankish army (30,000 men) to Orléans and crosses the Loire River, probably accompanied by Eudes of Aquitaine, with his remaining troops. He makes camp near Tours, probably at Ballan-Miré south-west of the fortress city, in order to protect the abbey of Saint Martin. Charles defeats or forces back Umayyad scouts  or an advance guard, between the rivers Indre and Creuse. Abdul Rahman Al Ghafiqi pulls back to establish a position at the Vienne River.
 October – The Frankish army crosses the Vienne River and establishes a camp at or around the partially abandoned Roman mansion or agricultural settlement, now known as 'Vieux-Poitiers' (near Châtellerault), perhaps using the Roman theatre with its substantial towers as a fortification. Charles Martel forms a defensive position across the Roman road, and fends off Muslim skirmishes during the 'seven days' stand-off, probably involving scouts, and perhaps raiders from both armies.  
 October 10 – Battle of Tours: The Frankish and Burgundian forces under Charles Martel defeat a large army of Abdul Rahman Al Ghafiqi, near Poitiers, halting the Islamic advance into Western Europe; Rahman Al Ghafiqi is killed during the battle. Charles extends his authority in the south of France, which gives him the nickname Martellus ("The Hammer"). The outcome of the victory is a turning point, and establishes a balance of power between Western Europe and the Byzantine Empire.
 Muslim forces withdraw southwards to Septimania; a separate part probably pulls back along the road it originally came through, across the Pyrenees Mountains. Eudes of Aquitaine pursues the main Muslim army via La Marche, before returning to Bordeaux; Charles Martel withdraws to Frankish territory through Orléans and Auxerre, demoting those bishops whom he thought unreliable. Abd al-Malik ibn Katan al-Fihri becomes the new governor (wali) of Al-Andalus; a separate Muslim force raids the Rhône region.

 Britain 
 Autumn – King Ceolwulf of Northumbria is deposed by opponents, and forced to enter a monastery. His supporters subsequently restore him to the throne (or 731).

 By topic 
 Astronomy 
 June 26 – Venus occults Jupiter.

 Religion 
 Pope Gregory III confers on Boniface, Anglo-Saxon missionary, the pallium as archbishop, with jurisdiction over Bavaria (modern Germany). He orders him to forbid the consumption of horseflesh by his Christian converts.
 Ecgbert is appointed bishop of York, by his cousin Ceolwulf of Northumbria. He founds a library, and makes the city a renowned centre of learning (approximate date).

Births 
 Fujiwara no Momokawa, Japanese statesman (d. 779)

Deaths 
 Abdul Rahman Al Ghafiqi, governor of Al-Andalus
 Nechtan mac Der-Ilei, king of the Picts
 Romuald II, duke of Benevento (Italy)
 Rupert of Bingen, patron saint (b. 712) 
 Sima Zhen, Chinese historian (b. 679)

References